The Hundred of Blyth is a hundred of Palmerston County, Northern Territory, Australia.

The hundred is located at -13°12' S, 130°39' E, was gazetted on 14 September 1871 was named for Arthur Blyth.

References

B